An inscribed polygon might refer to any polygon which is inscribed in a shape, especially:

A cyclic polygon, which is inscribed in a circle (the circumscribed circle)
A midpoint polygon of another polygon